Messum's is an art gallery in Bury Street, St. James's, London, with a branch in Marlow, Buckinghamshire and an associated gallery in Tisbury, Wiltshire.

History 
The gallery was founded by David Messum in 1963. The gallery exhibits contemporary art and work by British Impressionist, modern and figurative painters and sculptors. Messum's has promoted the work of the early Newlyn and St Ives painters.

Messum's has staged significant exhibitions of British Impressionism, and in 1985 David Messum's publishing company published British Impressionism: A Garden of Bright Images by Laura Wortley.

In 2012 a proposed development in Cork Street threatened to cause Messum's to move.

In 2016, Johnny Messum founded Messums Wiltshire, an art gallery based in the tithe barn at Place Farm, Tisbury, Wiltshire. This operates as an independent business.

Artists 
Artists who have exhibited at the gallery include William Bowyer, Peter Brown, James Dodds, Rose Hilton, Kurt Jackson, Edward Piper, John Piper and Jeremy Annear.

References

External links
 Messum's website

1963 establishments in England
Art galleries in London
Art galleries established in 1963
Contemporary art galleries in London
Buildings and structures in the City of Westminster